Tap Dance City is a retired American-bred Japanese-trained  Thoroughbred racehorse and active sire. He showed promising form in his early racing career, winning the Asahi Challenge Cup in 2002. He reached his peak as a six-year-old in 2003 when he won the Kinko Sho and the Kyoto Daishoten before defeating a strong international field by a record margin in the Japan Cup. In the following year he won a second Kinko Sho and then took the Takarazuka Kinen. He won a third Kinko Sho as an eight-year-old in 2005.

Background
Tap Dance City is a bay horse bred in Kentucky by Echo Valley Horse Farm & Swettenham Stud. He was sired by the Eclipse Award winning stallion Pleasant Tap, whose other progeny included the Champion Stakes winner David Junior. His dam, All Dance, was a sister of the Kentucky Derby winner Winning Colors and produced several good winners including the leading British hurdler Ruling.

Racing career

2000–2002: early career
Tap Dance City won two of his nine races a three-year-old in 2000, but failed to win in six races in 2001. He emerged as a top-class performer in 2002 when he won the Grade 3 Asahi Challenge Cup. In December 2002, as an 85/1 outsider, he produced his best performance up to that point when he finished second to Symboli Kris S in the Grade 1 Arima Kinen at Nakayama Racecourse.

2003: six-year-old season
Tap Dance City began his six-year-old season by winning a handicap race at Tokyo Racecourse and then won the Grade 2 Kinko Sho at Chukyo Racecourse in May. In June he finished third to Hishi Miracle in the Takarazuka Kinen, with the unplaced horses including Neo Universe, Symboli Kris S and Agnes Digital. On his return from the summer break, Tap Dance City won the Grade 2 Kyoto Daishoten, beating Hishi Miracle by one and a quarter lengths after leading from the start.

On 30 November 2003, Tap Dance City, ridden by Tetsuzo Sato, started at odds of 12.8/1 for the 22nd running of the Japan Cup at Tokyo. Apart from the Japanese contenders such as Symboli Kris S and Neo Universe, the race attracted international challengers including Islington from England, Johar from the United States and Fields of Omagh from Australia. Tap Dance City went into the lead from the start and opened up a seven length advantage with five furlongs left to run. He was never challenged and won by a record margin of nine lengths from the Kikuka Sho winner That's The Plenty, with Symboli Kris S and Neo Universe in third and fourth places.

2004–2005: later career
In 2004, Tap Dance City won the Kinko Sho for a second time before starting 5/2 favourite for the Takarazuka Kinen at Hanshin Racecourse on 27 June. Sato tracked the leaders before sending the seven-year-old into the lead half a mile from the finish. Tap Dance City won by two lengths and three quarters of a length from Silk Famous and Lincoln, with Zenno Rob Roy taking fourth ahead of That's The Plenty. In autumn, Tap Dance City was sent to Europe to contest the Prix de l'Arc de Triomphe at Longchamp Racecourse on 3 October. Starting at odds of 10/1 he disputed the lead until the turn into the straight, but faded in the closing stages and finished seventeenth of the nineteen runners behind Bago. Tap Dance City returned to Japan, and in December he finished second in the Arima Kinen, beaten half a length by Zenno Rob Roy, with Delta Blues, Hishi Miracle and Heart's Cry among the unplaced finishers.

As an eight-year-old, Tap Dance City won the Kinko Sho for a third time but finished unplaced in his remaining four races.

Stud record
Tap Dance City was retired from racing to become a breeding stallion at the Breeders' Stallion Station. To date he had made no impact as a sire of winners. He was "put out of stud" in Japan on 12 May 2011.

Pedigree

References

Racehorses bred in Kentucky
Racehorses trained in Japan
1997 racehorse births
Thoroughbred family 23-b
Japan Cup winners